Koçak may refer to:

People
 Abdülkadir Koçak (born 1981), Turkish boxer
 Adem Koçak (born 1983), Turkish footballer
 Celaleddin Koçak (born 1977), Turkish footballer
 Ekrem Koçak (1931–1993), Turkish distance runner 
 Matej Kocak (1882–1918), United States Marine Corps sergeant

Places
 Koçak, Çivril
 Koçak, Köşk, a village in the District of Köşk, Aydın Province, Turkey.
 Koçak, Gercüş, a village in the District of Gercüş, Batman Province, Turkey

Turkish-language surnames